The enzyme limonin-D-ring-lactonase (EC 3.1.1.36) catalyzes the reaction

limonoate D-ring-lactone + H2O  limonoate

This enzyme belongs to the family of hydrolases, specifically those acting on carboxylic ester bonds.  The systematic name of this enzyme class is limonoate-D-ring-lactone lactonohydrolase. Other names in common use include limonin-D-ring-lactone hydrolase, and limonin lactone hydrolase.

References

 

EC 3.1.1
Enzymes of unknown structure